Operation Jayasikurui (Certain Victory in Sinhala), was a Sri Lankan military operation launched on 13 May 1997, it lasted until 1999, when it was called off. The operation was initially launched for 6 months but cancelled after 18 months as Sri Lankan government faced huge loss. It was the largest military operation undertaken by the armed forces at the time.

The primary objective of this operation was to clear a land route to the government-held Jaffna peninsula (which had no land supply routes) through territory held by the LTTE (or Liberation Tigers of Tamil Eelam, popularly known as the Tamil Tigers), by linking the government-held towns of Vavuniya and Kilinochchi.

At the time it was the largest military operation undertaken by the Sri Lankan military. Initially, the Sri Lankan military experienced success by forcing the LTTE out of Killinochchi, capturing large areas, however, the LTTE managed to launch an effective counter-attack which reversed some gains made by the government forces. After failing to achieve the original objective, the government called off the operation.

Background

Following Operation Riviresa in 1995, the Sri Lankan military gained control over the Jaffna peninsula. The LTTE withdrew to the jungles of the Wanni from where in 1996 they launched an attack on the isolated Sri Lanka Army (SLA) garrison in Mullaitivu.

After the Battle of Mullaitivu the LTTE gained control over the Mullaitivu district, since the government did not re-establish a base due to the lack of a land supply route to it. Instead, at the request of the deputy minister of defence, Gen. Anurudha Ratwatte, the military forces began to plan a large-scale operation to open a land route to Jaffna.

The battle
The operation launched on 13 May 1997, with the 53rd Division spearheading the offensive along with the 21st, 54th, 55th and 56th Divisions. It was preceded by a massive artillery and aerial bombardment, with the SLA breaking out of their fortifications at Vavuniya and Manal Aru and pushing into LTTE-controlled Vanni.

The stated objective of the operation was to capture the A9 Highway, running from Vavuniya to the Jaffna peninsula, thereby allowing the establishment of a main supply route (MSR) to the SLA's isolated Jaffna garrison. It was also meant to engage and draw the LTTE out of its secure jungle bases. The Tigers could then be crippled, if not destroyed, by the SLA's superior firepower. The SLA wanted to diminish the strength of the LTTE by the end of the year so that it had to fight only a low-intensity guerrilla war.

The operation was very ambitious from the start, requiring large numbers of troops for both offensive operations and the defense of the captured territory. As a result, units of the Sri Lanka Navy and the Sri Lanka Air Force were deployed for ground operations in support of the SLA.

The LTTE also staged a number of counterattacks against SLA positions throughout the campaign. One was during June 1997, when the Tigers launched attacks on the SLA-held towns of Thandikulam and Omanthai. TamilNet claimed that the attacks left 700 SLA soldiers dead and some 1,500 wounded in contrast to only 165 dead rebels.

In addition, the SLA garrison at Mannakulam was also attacked on 4 December 1997; 146 SLA soldiers were killed in the fighting along with an unknown number of LTTE.

The operation nevertheless did not manage to accomplish over half of its objectives. By mid-May 1998 it had completely stalled. The LTTE didn't show any resistance initially, but at Puliyankulam, LTTE troops led by Brig. Theepan showed huge resistance and blocked the Army at Puliyankulam for more than 4 months. LTTE cadres penetrated SLA lines and sabotaged a major staging area, destroying vast quantities of supplies and killing dozens of troops. Puliyankulam was meant to be the linking-up point for the twin prongs of the SLA assault. However, the LTTE had built effective defenses at the village and after three months of heavy fighting the SLA had to withdraw after suffering hundreds of casualties and dozens of tanks destroyed.

The LTTE cadres at Puliyankulam had irrevocably delayed the SLA's advance and the operation could no longer be completed on time. With stiff resistance in place, the Army bypassed Puliyankulam and maneuvered through jungles and reached another village called Kanagarayankulam, hoping to outmaneuver the LTTE cadres, but the LTTE managed to hold off the Army's advance.

Unable to break LTTE defense lines, the SLA decided to open the battle on multiple fronts. As the fight continued, defense lines become very long, stretching from Nay-Aaru all the way to Mannar. The fighting would continue for several months but the critical A9 highway (between Mankulam and Kilinochchi) remained in the LTTE's occupation.

In 1998, the SLA moved some of its forces from Kilinochchi towards the south, leaving the entire district vulnerable. In September 1998, the LTTE launched its "Operation Unceasing Waves II", resulting in the capture of the entire Kilinochchi district. Brutal fighting continued on the A9 highway. LTTE admitted to losing some 1,300 fighters during the course of actions in the first year of the Jayasikurui counter battles.

Aftermath
Operation Jayasikurui ended after 19 months in 1999 when it was called off by then-President Chandrika Kumaratunga. The operation had failed to achieve its objective of gaining a land route to Jaffna, but had acquired the towns of Mannakulam, Omanthai and Nedunkerni. However, in the process several areas, including the town of Kilinochchi, were lost to the LTTE, which also claimed to have captured a 122mm artillery piece (bringing its total to five), 81mm and 60mm mortars, machine guns, RPG launchers and assault rifles.

The human cost of the operation was high, with both sides sustaining heavy casualties. The government admitted to losing around 1,350 soldiers since the start of the operation, although some independent western analysts thought that the figure could be as many as 1,500 to 3,000.

The leader of the main Sri Lankan opposition party, Mr. Ranil Wickremasinghe said in parliament on Saturday, 10 October 1998(4 months before the official end of the operation), that a total of 3,566 SLA troops had been killed and 11,200 wounded during Operation 'Jayasikurui'. 1,516 troops had been killed and 8,000 wounded in the first year of 'Jayasikirui', he added.

See also
 Operation Riviresa
 Battle of Mullaitivu
 Thandikulam-Omanthai offensive
 Oddusuddan offensive

References

External links
Sri Lanka Army 
Operation Jayasikurui, Sri Lanka Army
Pro-rebel 

Jayasikurui
Jayasikurui
1997 in Sri Lanka